Masayuki Mori may refer to:

 Masayuki Mori (actor) (1911–1973), Japanese actor in Akira Kurosawa's films
 Masayuki Mori (film producer) (born 1953), Japanese film producer